Youssef Achami  (born 31 July 1976 in Agadir) is a former Moroccan footballer.

Club career
Achami was part of the generation of Raja Casablanca players who experienced a period of exceptional success, with the club winning six consecutive Botola titles and two Moroccan Throne Cups. Achami helped Raja Casablanca win the 2000 CAF Super Cup and scored a goal for the club in the group stage of the 2000 FIFA Club World Championship.

In 2003, Achami moved abroad, joining Belgian third division side K.V.S.K. United Overpelt-Lommel where he led the club in scoring with 15 goals. A spell in the Netherlands with FC Eindhoven followed.

After he retired from playing football, Achami became a coach. He had spells as assistant manager at Wydad Casablanca and OC Safi.

References

1973 births
Living people
People from Agadir
Moroccan footballers
Raja CA players
FC Eindhoven players
Association football forwards